Xavier Levi Simons (born 20 February 2003) is an English professional footballer who plays as a midfielder for EFL Championship club Hull City. He previously played for Premier League club Chelsea.

Club career

Chelsea
Simons signed for Chelsea in 2016 from local rivals Brentford. He made his Chelsea debut on 22 December 2021 in the quarterfinals of the EFL Cup, starting in a 2–0 win against his former club at Brentford Community Stadium.

Loan to Hull City
On 1 September 2022, he moved on loan to Hull City for the season. On 16 March it was announced that the deal had been made permanent.

International career
Having represented England from U15 through to U17 level, Simons made his U19 debut as a substitute in a 3–1 win over Republic of Ireland during 2022 UEFA European Under-19 Championship qualification at the Bescot Stadium on 23 March 2022.

Career statistics

References

2003 births
Living people
Footballers from Hammersmith
English footballers
Association football midfielders
Brentford F.C. players
Chelsea F.C. players
England youth international footballers
Hull City A.F.C. players